Frode Kippe (born 17 January 1978) is a Norwegian former professional footballer who played as a central defender, mostly for Lillestrøm in the Eliteserien. He made eight appearances for the Norway national team. With 441 top division appearances, Kippe has made the third-highest number of appearances in Eliteserien.

Career
Kippe started his career playing amateur football for Kolbotn, but moved to top-flight side Lillestrøm at the age of 19 to play professionally. At the end of the 1998 season Kippe was signed by English Premier League club Liverpool. At Anfield he was restricted to just two substitute appearances in the League Cup against Hull City and Grimsby Town. Kippe instead spent time out on loan at Stoke City where he linked up with a number of Scandinavian players. He played 20 times for Stoke in 1999–2000 scoring against Preston North End and returned in 2000–01 where he played 24 times. Kippe returned to Norway in 2002 and re-signed for Lillestrøm where he was made club captain and led the team to victory in the 2007 Norwegian Cup Final and the 2017 Norwegian Cup Final, where he even scored a goal. On 23 October 2019, Kippe announced that he would retire as player at the end of the 2019 season. On 4 November 2020, Kippe made comeback for Lillestrøm.

Career statistics

Club

International

Honours
Lillestrøm
Norwegian Cup: 2007, 2017

Individual
Kniksen award: Defender of the Year in 2007

References

External links
 Official Lillestrom SK profile
 LFCHistory.net profile
 

1978 births
Living people
Footballers from Oslo
Norwegian footballers
Norway under-21 international footballers
Norway international footballers
Liverpool F.C. players
Stoke City F.C. players
Lillestrøm SK players
Kniksen Award winners
Association football defenders
Expatriate footballers in England
Norwegian expatriate footballers
Eliteserien players
English Football League players